CARTO (formerly CartoDB) is a software as a service (SaaS) cloud computing platform that provides GIS, web mapping, and spatial data science tools. The company is positioned as a Location Intelligence platform due to tools with an aptitude for data analysis and visualization that do not require previous GIS or development experience.

CARTO users can use the company's free platform or deploy their own instance of the open source software. It was first released in Beta at FOSS4G in Denver in September 2011, and officially debuted as a final release at Where2.0 in April 2012.

Since 2014, CARTO is a company independent from Vizzuality.
The Spanish start-up raised $7 million from a consortium of investors in September 2014. In September 2015, CARTO received a $23 million in Series B financing. In May 2019, CARTO acquired Geographica, in an effort to boost their professional services offering.

Technology
CARTO is an open source software built on PostGIS and PostgreSQL. The tool uses JavaScript extensively in the front end web application, back end Node.js based APIs, and for client libraries. CARTO's platform consists of several primary components.

CARTO Builder 

The first is the web application called Builder where users can manage data, run user side analysis and design custom maps. Builder is intended for non-developers and beginners to have access to, and be able to use advanced geospatial tools.  In Builder, advanced users also have access to a web interface where SQL can be used to manipulate data and CartoCSS, a cartography language similar to CSS, can be used for data driven map design.

CARTO Engine 

The CARTO Engine, which is a set of APIs and developer libraries for building custom map and data visualization interfaces.

APIs 

The Maps API: acts as a dynamic tile service, which creates new tiles based on client requests. This allows users to design maps in the web application, then use those styles and data in custom web applications.

The SQL API, where PostgreSQL-supported SQL statements can be used to retrieve data from the database. The SQL API serves data in various formats including Shapefile, GeoJSON, and CSV.

The Data Services API allows for easily building functionalities such as routing, geocoding, and vector basemaps.

JavaScript libraries 

Finally, there are the Carto.js and CARTO VL libraries, which can wrap the APIs into complete visualizations or be used to integrate data into other web applications with raster or vector renderings, respectively.

CARTOframes 

CARTOframes is a Python package for integrating CARTO maps, analysis, and data services into data science workflows via Jupyter notebooks.

Data Observatory 
CARTO offers a wide range of datasets from around the globe accessible though their Data Observatory, which acts as their spacial data repository. Data scientists can augment their data and broaden their analysis with the location data available in the Data Observatory.

Communities
In addition to several independent user communities, many businesses and organizations have adopted the SaaS service or the open source platform for their own needs. Notable groups include NASA, Nokia, and Twitter.

See also
 Geographic information system
 Spatial database
 Web data services
 Web mapping

References

GIS software
Data visualization software